The following is a list of county roads in Walton County, Florida.  All county roads are maintained by the county in which they reside.

County roads in Walton County

References

FDOT Map of Walton County, Florida
FDOT GIS data, accessed January 2014

 
County